Nikolje Rudničko is the Serbian Orthodox monastery located in Donja Šatornja, 12 km away from Topola, Serbia.

History 
The monastery was founded by Nikola Dorjenović, nobleman of despot Stefan Lazarević, in 1425.

Based on the records etched into the stone blocks on the north facade of the church (now plastered), it is concluded that in the second half of the fifteenth and early sixteenth century monastery had very developed monastic life. In the seventeenth century, when the monastery was reestablished again, there was a major renovation, therefore it is believed that before the renovation monastery was damaged and abandoned for a short period of time. Monastery Nikolje in the eighteenth century was an important spiritual and cultural center in this part of Serbia. Joakim Vujic says that the Turks often burned and looted, but failed to destroy monastery. In 1817 a monumental bell tower was built in the west part of the temple.

The reconstruction of the temple in 1850 performed painters Zivko Pavlovic and Ilija Stoicevic. Risto Nikolic, one of the best icon painters in Serbia painted the icons for the iconostasis.

References 

Monasteries in Serbia